The State of Mississippi has a total of five metropolitan statistical areas (MSAs) that are fully or partially located in the state. 17 of the state's 82 counties are classified by the United States Census Bureau as metropolitan. As of the 2000 census, these counties had a combined population of 1,194,522 (42.0% of the state's total population). Based on a July 1, 2009 population estimate, that figure rose to 1,311,726 (44.4% of the state's total population).

Metropolitan areas
Gulfport-Biloxi MSA
Hancock County
Harrison County
Stone County
Hattiesburg MSA
Forrest County
Lamar County
Perry County
Jackson MSA
Copiah County
Hinds County
Madison County
Rankin County
Simpson County
Memphis, TN-AR-MS MSA
DeSoto County
Marshall County
Tate County
Tunica County
Pascagoula MSA
George County
Jackson County
New Orleans metropolitan area
Pearl River County, Mississippi

Population statistics

Combined Statistical Areas

The United States Census Bureau defines a Combined Statistical Area (CSA) as an aggregate of adjacent Core Based Statistical Areas (CBSAs) that are linked by commuting ties. There are three combined statistical areas in Mississippi.

Population statistics

See also
List of micropolitan areas in Mississippi
List of cities in Mississippi
List of towns and villages in Mississippi
Mississippi census statistical areas
Table of United States primary census statistical areas (PCSA)
Table of United States Combined Statistical Areas (CSA)
Table of United States Metropolitan Statistical Areas (MSA)
Table of United States Micropolitan Statistical Areas (μSA)

References

 
 
Metropolitan areas
Mississippi